Father Jules Monchanin (who chose to call himself Swami Paramarubyananda), (April 10, 1895 in Fleurie, Rhône - October 10, 1957 in Paris) was a French Catholic priest, monk and hermit. He was an ardent proponent of Hindu-Christian interfaith dialogue. He is known for the being one of the  "Trinity from Tannirpalli" along with Le Saux, and Griffiths who were the co-founders of Saccidananda Ashram (also called Shantivanam), an ashram founded in the village of Tannirpalli in Tamil Nadu in 1938.

Monchanin received Final Sacrament in 1932 but survived.  On the same day, he received a letter from Father Kalathil inviting him to come to India.

Partial works
 De l'esthétique à la Mystique (From aesthetics to the Mystic), 1955
 Ecrits spirituels (Spiritual Writings), 1965
  Lettres à sa mère, 1913 - 1957 (Letters to my mother, 1913 - 1957). Présentation F. Jacquin. Paris, Le Cerf, 1989.
 Mystique de l'Inde, mystère chrétien : écrits et inédits (Mystique of India, mystery Christian writings and unpublished), Paris: Fayard, 1974. Fata Morgana, 1999.
 Lettres au Père Le Saux (1947-1957) de J. Monchanin. (Letters to Father Le Saux (1947-1957)). Présentation F. Jacquin. Paris, Cerf, 1995.
 Théologie et spiritualité missionnaires (Theology and Spirituality missionaries) Présentation E. Duperray et J. Gadille. Paris, Beauchesne, 1985.
 Ermites du saccidânanda: Un essai d’intégration chrétienne de la tradition monastique de l’Inde. Paris, Casterman, 1956. 204 pp. [JC, NO]
 Swami Parama Arubianandam (Fr. Monchanin): A Memorial. Tiruchirapalli: Saccidananda Ashram, 1959. 224 pp. 
 Swami Parama Arubianandam (Fr. Monchanin). French tr. of above. Paris: Casterman, 1960. 198 pp. 
 Une amitié sacerdotale : Jules Monchanin-Edouard Duperray (1919-1990). Correspondance présentée par Françoise Jacquin. Lessius, 2003.

Secondary sources
 Françoise, Jacquin. Jules Monchanin prêtre. Paris, Le Cerf, 1996.
 de Lubac, Henri. Images de l’Abbé Monchanin. Paris, Montaigne 1967.
 Vagneux, Yann. Co-esse. Le mystère trinitaire dans la pensée de Jules Monchanin (1895-1957). Paris: Desclée de Brouwer, 2015.
 Vagneux, Yann. Prêtre à Bénarés. Paris: Editions jésuites, 2018. (some mentions of Monchanin, cf. Index)
 Roche, Sten. Jules Monchanin: Pioneer in Hindu-Christian Dialogue. ISPCK 1993.
 Coward, Harold. Review of Sten Roche, Jules Monchanin: Pioneer in Hindu-Christian Dialogue. Hindu-Christian Studies Bulletin, Vol. 7, 1994.

References

Further reading

1895 births
1957 deaths
20th-century French Roman Catholic priests
Christian and Hindu interfaith dialogue
French expatriates in India
People from Rhône (department)